Long After Dark is the fifth studio album by American rock band Tom Petty and the Heartbreakers, released November 2, 1982 on Backstreet Records. Notable for the MTV hit "You Got Lucky", the album was also the band's first to feature Howie Epstein on bass and harmony vocals. Epstein's vocals are prevalent throughout the album and from that point on, became an integral part of the Heartbreakers' sound.

Two other singles from the album were released, "Change of Heart" and "Straight into Darkness". The first of these joined "You Got Lucky" in the Billboard top 40. In July 2018, "Keep a Little Soul", an outtake from Long After Dark, was released as the first single to promote Petty's box set An American Treasure. "Keeping Me Alive", another outtake from the sessions for the album, was a Petty favorite, and was eventually released on his and the Heartbreakers' 1995 box set Playback, as well as on An American Treasure.

Track listing

Personnel
Tom Petty & the Heartbreakers

Tom Petty – lead vocals, guitars (acoustic, electric, 12-string, lead on "We Stand a Chance"), Prophet 5 synthesizer
Mike Campbell – guitars (lead, 12-string), organ on "We Stand a Chance"
Howie Epstein – bass guitar, backing vocals
Benmont Tench – acoustic and electric pianos, Hammond and Vox organs, oberheim OB-Xa synthesizer, backing vocals
Stan Lynch – drums, backing vocals

Additional musicians

Ron Blair – bass guitar on "Between Two Worlds"
Phil Jones – percussion

Production

 Jimmy Iovine – production
Stephen Marcussen – mastering
Tom Petty – production
Don Smith – engineer
Tommy Steele – design
Shelly Yakus – engineer

Charts

Weekly charts

Year-end charts

Certifications

References

Tom Petty albums
1982 albums
Albums produced by Jimmy Iovine
Albums produced by Tom Petty
Albums recorded at Record Plant (Los Angeles)
Backstreet Records albums